Fools of Fortune is a 1922 American silent comedy Western film directed by Louis Chaudet and starring Russell Simpson, Marguerite De La Motte and Tully Marshall.

Cast
 Frank Dill as Chuck Warner
 Russell Simpson as Magpie Simpkins
 Tully Marshall as Scenery Sims
 Frank Brownlee as Ike Harper
 Tom Ricketts as Milton DePuyster 
 Lillian Langdon as Mrs DePuyster
 Marguerite De La Motte as Marion DePuyster

References

Bibliography
 Connelly, Robert B. The Silents: Silent Feature Films, 1910-36, Volume 40, Issue 2. December Press, 1998.
 Munden, Kenneth White. The American Film Institute Catalog of Motion Pictures Produced in the United States, Part 1. University of California Press, 1997.

External links
 

1922 films
1922 comedy films
1922 Western (genre) films
1920s English-language films
American silent feature films
Silent American Western (genre) comedy films
American black-and-white films
Films directed by Louis Chaudet
1920s American films
1920s Western (genre) comedy films